Frank J. Moore  (September 12, 1877 – May 20, 1964) was a pitcher in Major League Baseball. He played in one game for the 1905 Pittsburgh Pirates. He pitched three innings, allowing two hits but no runs and striking out one. He played in the minors through 1912 and was later a manager in the Ohio State League and Virginia Mountain League from 1912-1914.

External links

1877 births
1964 deaths
Major League Baseball pitchers
Pittsburgh Pirates players
Baseball players from Ohio
People from Dover, Ohio
Minor league baseball managers
Waco Tigers players
Duluth White Sox players
Greenville Hunters players
Coffeyville Glassblowers players
Newark Newks players
Portsmouth Cobblers players
Marion Orphans players
Ironton Diggers players
Maysville Angels players